Marfleet railway station is a disused railway station on the North Eastern Railway's Hull and Holderness Railway in the Marfleet area of the city of Hull in the East Riding of Yorkshire, England. It was opened by the Hull and Holderness Railway on 27 June 1854. The station was closed to passengers on 19 October 1964 and to freight on 1 May 1972.

References

 

Railway stations in Great Britain opened in 1854
Railway stations in Great Britain closed in 1964
Disused railway stations in Kingston upon Hull
Former North Eastern Railway (UK) stations
Beeching closures in England
Hull and Holderness Railway